Covington House may refer to:

Covington House (Tallahassee, Florida), listed on the National Register of Historic Places (NRHP) in Florida
Covington House (Richmond, Kentucky), listed on the NRHP in Kentucky
Covington Institute Teachers' Residence, Springfield, KY, listed on the NRHP in Kentucky
Covington House (DeSoto, Mississippi), listed on the NRHP in Mississippi
Robert L. Covington House, Hazlehurst, MS, listed on the NRHP in Mississippi
Covington Plantation House, Rockingham, NC, listed on the NRHP in North Carolina
Robert D. Covington House, Washington, UT, listed on the NRHP in Washington
Covington House (Vancouver, Washington), listed on the NRHP in Washington